The 2020–21 FC Spartak Trnava season is the club's 27th season in the Slovak Super Liga and 19th consecutive. Spartak participated in the Fortuna Liga and Slovak Cup. 

Club changes coach after 6 rounds of the league. Marián Šarmír ended after 3 months of his work in Spartak. Norbert Hrnčár began in 14 September and ended in the end of the year 2020. A new coach Michal Gašparík started after a winter break of the league in first 2021's training.

Players

Friendles

Pre-season

Mid-season

Tipsport Malta Cup 
Spartak Trnava was on the third edition of the Tipsport Cup played on National Stadium Ta' Qali in Malta. The tournament was taken place from 3 January to 10 January. Participants were also Sigma Olomouc, Zbrojovka Brno and WSG Swarovski Tirol. All teams were played two matches.

Winter Tipsport Liga 
Spartak Trnava was also invited on the Czech-Slovak winter Tipsport Liga. Slovak group "C" was organized by Spartak on the artificial turf Slávia.

End of the Mid-season

Competition overview

Fortuna liga

Regular stage

League table

Results summary

Results by round

Matches

Championship group

League table

Results summary

Results by round

Matches

Slovak Cup

Statistics

Appearances and goals

|-
! colspan=14 style="background:#dcdcdc; text-align:center| Goalkeepers

|-
! colspan=14 style="background:#dcdcdc; text-align:center| Defenders

|-
! colspan=14 style="background:#dcdcdc; text-align:center| Midfielders 

|-
! colspan=14 style="background:#dcdcdc; text-align:center| Forwards

|-
! colspan=14 style="background:#dcdcdc; text-align:center| Players transferred out during the season

|}

Goalscorers

Awards

Goal of the Month

Notes

References

External links 
 Official website
 Futbalnet

FC Spartak Trnava
FC Spartak Trnava seasons